Red Rosa may refer to:

Claire Lacombe (b. 1765), French actress
Rosa Luxemburg (1871–1919), Polish Marxist theorist, socialist philosopher, and revolutionary